Brian Usher (born 11 March 1944) is an English former footballer who played in the Football League for Doncaster Rovers, Sheffield Wednesday and Sunderland.

References

External links
 

English footballers
England under-23 international footballers
English Football League players
1944 births
Living people
Sunderland A.F.C. players
Sheffield Wednesday F.C. players
Doncaster Rovers F.C. players
Yeovil Town F.C. players
Association football wingers